The Week in Religion is an American religious television program broadcast on the now defunct DuMont Television Network. The series ran from March 16, 1952, to October 18, 1954. The program gave equal time to Jewish, Protestant, and Roman Catholic speakers; it was hosted by Rabbi William S. Rosenbloom, Reverend Robbins Wolcott Barstow, and Reverend Joseph N. Moody.

The program, produced and distributed by DuMont, aired on Sundays at 6pm ET on most DuMont affiliates. The series was cancelled in 1954.

See also
List of programs broadcast by the DuMont Television Network
List of surviving DuMont Television Network broadcasts

References

Bibliography
David Weinstein, The Forgotten Network: DuMont and the Birth of American Television (Philadelphia: Temple University Press, 2004) 
Alex McNeil, Total Television, Fourth edition (New York: Penguin Books, 1980) 
Tim Brooks and Earle Marsh, The Complete Directory to Prime Time Network TV Shows, Third edition (New York: Ballantine Books, 1964)

External links

DuMont historical website

DuMont Television Network original programming
1952 American television series debuts
1954 American television series endings
Black-and-white American television shows
English-language television shows
American religious television series